Kolsvatnet is a lake in the municipality of Valle in Agder county, Norway. The lake is located south of the lake Botnsvatnet, east of the mountain Urddalsknuten, and northeast of the lake Rosskreppfjorden.

See also
List of lakes in Aust-Agder
List of lakes in Norway

References

Lakes of Agder
Valle, Norway